Idon may refer to:

iDon, an album by Don Omar
Idon, Nigeria, a town
Idon language, a Nigerian language